Edinburgh is a town in Ehlanzeni District Municipality in the Mpumalanga province of South Africa.

References

Populated places in the Bushbuckridge Local Municipality